Hypostomus occidentalis is a species of catfish in the family Loricariidae. It is native to South America, where it occurs in the Suriname River basin in Suriname. The species reaches 14.6 cm (5.7 inches) in standard length and is believed to be a facultative air-breather.

References 

occidentalis
Fish described in 1968